Forchheim (Oberfr) station is a railway station in the town of Forchheim, in the Forchheim district in Upper Franconia, Germany.

References

Nuremberg S-Bahn stations
Railway stations in Bavaria
Buildings and structures in Forchheim